Andrea Rose Fraser (born 1965) is a performance artist, mainly known for her work in the area of Institutional Critique. Fraser is based in New York and Los Angeles and is currently Department Head and Professor of Interdisciplinary Studio of the UCLA School of Arts and Architecture at the University of California, Los Angeles.

Early life and career
Fraser was born in Billings, Montana and grew up in Berkeley, California. She attended New York University, the Whitney Museum of American Art's Independent Study Program, and the School of Visual Arts. Fraser worked as a gallery attendant at Dia:Chelsea.

Fraser began writing art criticism before incorporating a similar analysis into her artistic practice.

Work
Fraser was co-organizer, with Helmut Draxler, of Services, a "working-group exhibition" that has been conceived at Kunstraum of Lüneburg University and toured to eight venues in Europe and the United States between 1994 and 2001.

Museum Highlights (1989) involved Fraser posing as a Museum tour guide at the Philadelphia Museum of Art in 1989 under the pseudonym of Jane Castleton. During the performance, Fraser led a tour through the museum describing it in verbose and overly dramatic terms to her chagrined tour group. For example, in describing a common water fountain Fraser proclaims "a work of astonishing economy and monumentality ... it boldly contrasts with the severe and highly stylized productions of this form!"  Upon entering the museum cafeteria: "This room represents the heyday of colonial art in Philadelphia on the eve of the Revolution, and must be regarded as one of the very finest of all American rooms." The tour is based on a script culled from an array of sources: Immanuel Kant’s Critique of Judgment; a 1969 anthology of essays called "On Understanding Poverty"; and a 1987 article in The New York Times with the headline "Salad and Seurat: Sampling the Fare at Museums.”

In Kunst muss hängen ("Art Must Hang") (Galerie Christian Nagel/Cologne, 2001)—featured in Make Your Own Life: Artists In & Out of Cologne - Fraser reenacted an impromptu 1995 speech by a drunk Martin Kippenberger, word-by-word, gesture-for-gesture.

For Official Welcome (2001)—commissioned by the MICA Foundation for a private reception—Fraser mimicked "the banal comments and effusive words of praise uttered by presenters and recipients during art-awards ceremonies. Midstream, assuming the persona of a troubled, postfeminist art star, Fraser strips down, [...] to a Gucci thong, bra and high-heel shoes, and says, I'm not a person today. I'm an object in an art work."

Her videotape performance Little Frank and His Carp (2001), shot with five hidden cameras in the atrium of the Guggenheim Museum Bilbao, targets architectural dominance of  modern gallery spaces. Using the original soundtrack of an acoustic guide at the Guggenheim Museum Bilbao, she "... writhes with pleasure as the recorded voice draws attention to the undulating curves and textured surfaces of the surrounding space" which she takes literally in an "erotic encounter". Fraser's sexual display towards the architecture reveals the irony of the erotic words used on the audio tour to describe the museum's structure.

In her videotape performance Untitled (2003), 60 minutes in duration, Fraser recorded a hotel-room sexual encounter at the Royalton Hotel in New York, with a private collector, who had paid close to $20,000 to participate, "not for sex, according to the artist, but to make an artwork." According to Andrea Fraser, the amount that the collector had paid her has not been disclosed, and the "$20,000" figure is way off the mark. Only five copies of the 60-minute DVD were produced, three of which are in private collections, one being that of the collector with whom she had had the sexual encounter; he had pre-purchased the performance piece in which he was a participant. The contractual agreement, arranged by Friedrich Petzel Gallery, was proposed by Fraser as an assertion against the commoditization of art. Although critiqued both within and outside of the art world for prostituting herself, Fraser problematizes whether selling art to collectors in of itself is a form of prostitution.

Fraser's video installation Projection (2008) stages a psychoanalytic session in which the viewer is addressed as analyst, patient and voyeuristic spectator. The work is based on the transcripts of real psychoanalytic consultations, adapted into twelve monologues and alternated so that Fraser plays the roles of both analyst and patient. Looking directly into the camera, Fraser creates the effect of interacting with the image on the opposite wall but also with the viewer in the middle of the room, who becomes the object, or ‘psychoanalytic screen’, of each projection.

Fraser's performance piece, Not Just a Few of Us (2014), performed for Prospect.3 explores the desegregation struggles in New Orleans.

Teaching
Fraser has taught at University of California, Los Angeles, the Maine College of Art, Vermont College, the Whitney Independent Study Program, Columbia University School of the Arts, and the Center for Curatorial Studies, Bard College.

Exhibitions
Fraser's work has been shown in public galleries including the Philadelphia Museum of Art (1989); the Kunstverein München, (Germany, 1993, 1994); the Venice Biennale (Italy, 1993); the Sprengel Museum (Hannover, Germany, 1998); the Kunstverein Hamburg (Germany, 2003); the Whitechapel Art Gallery (London, England, 2003); the Los Angeles Museum of Contemporary Art (2005); the Frans Hals Museum (Haarlem, The Netherlands, 2007); and the Centre Pompidou (Paris, 2009). In 2013, a major retrospective of her work was organized by the Museum Ludwig, Cologne, in conjunction with her receipt of the Wolfgang Hahn Prize.

Collections
Fraser's work is held in major public collections including the Art Institute of Chicago; Centre Georges Pompidou, Paris; Fogg Museum, Cambridge; Museum of Contemporary Art, Los Angeles; Museum Ludwig, Cologne; Museum of Modern Art, New York; Philadelphia Museum of Art; and the Tate Modern, London.

She presented a lecture as part of the "Art and the Right to Believe" lecture series through the Visiting Artists Program at the School of the Art Institute of Chicago in February, 2009.

Recognition
Fraser has received fellowships from Art Docent Matter Inc., the Franklin Furnace Fund for Performance Art, the National Endowment for the Arts, and New York Foundation for the Arts. She also received a Foundation for Contemporary Arts Grants to Artists award (2017).  In December 2019 she was the subject of a significant article in The New York Times.

Notes

References

 

Fraser, Andrea. “There's No Place like Home.” Whitney Biennial 2012, edited by Elisabeth Sussman and Jay Sanders, Whitney Museum of American Art, 2012, pp. 28–33.

Doran, Anne. “'It's Important to Be Specific About What We Mean by Change': A Talk With Andrea Fraser.” ARTnews.com, ARTnews.com, 18 Nov. 2019, www.artnews.com/art- news/artists/its-important-to-be-specific-about-what-we-mean-by-change-a-talk-with-andrea-fraser-7467/.

External links
Andrea Fraser at Galerie Nagel Draxler
New York Times Article on Andrea Fraser

1965 births
Living people
Institutional Critique artists
American performance artists
Performance art in Los Angeles
American conceptual artists
Feminist artists
American women performance artists
Women conceptual artists
20th-century American artists
20th-century American women artists
21st-century American artists
21st-century American women artists
People from Billings, Montana
Artists from Montana
Artists from Berkeley, California
New York University alumni
School of Visual Arts alumni